Margaret J. M. Ezell is a Distinguished Professor at Texas A&M University and the Sara and John Lindsey Chair of Liberal Arts. Her scholarship focuses on late 17th- and early 18th-century literary culture, early modern women writers, history of authorship, reading and handwritten culture, feminist theory, digital cultures, and electronic media.

Educational career

She received her PhD at Cambridge University and her BA with Honors in English and History at Wellesley College.

Works

She is the author of several books including Writing Women's Literary History , The Patriarch's Wife , Social Authorship and the Advent of Print , and The Oxford English Literary History Volume v: 1645-1714: The Later Seventeenth Century . She has published articles in English Literary History and Shakespeare Studies. In 2011, she published an article in Modern Philology entitled "Elizabeth Isham's Books of Remembrance and Forgetting."

Books

The Oxford English Literary History: Volume V: 1645-1714: The Later Seventeenth Century. Oxford: Oxford University Press, 2017.
"My Rare Wit Killing Sin": Poems of a Restoration Courtier, Anne Killigrew Toronto:  Center for Renaissance and Reformation Studies/ ITER, 2013. 
Social Authorship and the Advert of Print. Baltimore: The Johns Hopkins University, 1999.
With Katherine O'Brien O'Keeffe, Cultural Artifacts and the Production of Meaning:  The Page, The Image, and The Body. Ann Arbor, MI: Univ. of Michigan Press, 1994.
Writing Women's Literary History. Baltimore: The Johns Hopkins Press, 1993.
The Patriarch's Wife: Literary Evidence and the History of the Family. Chapel Hill: University of North Carolina Press, 1987.

References

Living people
Wellesley College alumni
Alumni of the University of Cambridge
Texas A&M University faculty
Year of birth missing (living people)
American women non-fiction writers
American women academics
21st-century American women